The Kansas Historical Society is the official state historical society of Kansas.

Headquartered in Topeka, it operates as "the trustee of the state" for the purpose of maintaining the state's history and operates the Kansas Museum of History, Kansas State Archives and Library, Kansas State Capitol Tour Center, and 16 state-owned sites. It also serves as the State Historic Preservation Office, and works closely with the Kansas State Department of Education to provide standards-based programs for history and social studies curriculum in the schools.

History
In 1879 the Kansas Legislature enacted legislation that recognized the Historical Society as "the trustee of the state" for the purpose of maintaining the state's history. Since then the Historical Society has continued to enjoy the support of the state's newspaper publishers and has built one of the nation's most comprehensive statewide newspaper collections.

For nearly 40 years the Historical Society occupied a succession of quarters in the statehouse as its holdings steadily grew. In 1914 the collections were moved to the grand and newly constructed Memorial Building in downtown Topeka. In 1984 the Kansas Museum of History moved to an  site in west Topeka near the Potawatomi Mission leaving the remaining agencies still housed in the Memorial Building. The historic Stach School later joined the complex. During July and August 1995 the vast collections of library, archival, manuscript, and archeological materials were moved to new facilities in the State Archives and Library on the west Topeka site. In this headquarters, the Historical Society was reunited at one location.

The Kansas Historical Society is a state agency. Its sister organization, Kansas State Historical Society, Inc.', operates as a non-profit membership organization. More than six million individuals benefit from the Historical Society's programs and services each year. All activities and programs are conducted by the private organization and the Historical Society's six divisions: Administration, Cultural Resources, Education and Outreach, Historic Sites, Museum, and State Archives & Library.

The state agency operates with an annual appropriation of approximately six million dollars and approximately 100 employees. The nonprofit corporation's 102-member board of directors and 15-member executive committee are responsible for the Historical Society's overall governance. The corporation also offers membership to the public and institutions, manages grants for the state agency, operates the Museum Stores, and provides fiscal support for various programs, including the Historical Society's magazine, Reflections, and its scholarly journal, Kansas History: A Journal of the Central Plains.

During the past century, the Historical Society's role expanded beyond its original emphasis on collecting and publishing research. Today the Historical Society continues these fundamental activities and has added a broad array of interpretive and educational programs that combine with historic sites, technical assistance, and field service programs. Through collections, exhibits, programs, and services, the Historical Society enriches the lives of thousands and serves in understanding and valuing the heritage of Kansas.

The Kansas Historical Society website was launched in 1993, through the efforts of Steven Chinn and Lynn H. Nelson. The site originally was hosted at the University of Kansas. Several websites were built as part of the Kansas Heritage Group and included the Kansas Historical Society, Kansas Pioneers List, One-Room School House project, Johnson County Genealogical Society, Sunflower Journeys, Early Kansas Imprint Scanners, Historical Directory of Kansas Towns, the Kansas Humanities Council, Abilene Community Network, and the Kansas Community Network.

The original website was developed by two students based on materials supplied by the Society. The KSHS site was the first state or local history society anywhere to be online. Stephen Chinn took over the site management duties later in 1994. The Society's first web team, formed in 1993, was composed of David Haury, Suellyn Lathrop, Rebecca Martin, and Mark Adams.

In 1998, the Historical Society began hosting its own site and the URL became www.kshs.org. The site has grown to approximately 4,000 pages of information on Kansas history and has received numerous awards over the years.

State Historic Sites
The Historical Society operates 16 state-owned historic sites throughout the state. Those sites are:
Constitution Hall State Historic Site, Lecompton
Cottonwood Ranch State Historic Site, Studley
First Territorial Capitol State Historic Site, Fort Riley
Fort Hays State Historic Site, Hays
Goodnow House State Historic Site, Manhattan
Grinter Place State Historic Site, Kansas City
Hollenberg Pony Express Station State Historic Site, Hanover
Iowa and Sac & Fox Mission State Historic Site, Highland
John Brown Museum State Historic Site, Osawatomie
Kaw Mission State Historic Site, Council Grove
Marais des Cygnes Massacre State Historic Site, near Trading Post
Mine Creek Battlefield State Historic Site, near Pleasanton
Pawnee Indian Museum State Historic Site, Republic
Pawnee Rock State Historic Site, Pawnee Rock
Shawnee Indian Mission State Historic Site, Fairway
William Allen White House State Historic Site, Emporia

Register of Historic Kansas Places 
The Society also established a state heritage register in 1977 called the Register of Historic Kansas Places. All Kansas listings on the National Register of Historic Places are automatically included but many additional sites are just on the state registry.

Awards
The Kansas Historical Society has received several awards and honors from other organizations and associations related to the history profession:

 1998 - American Association for State and Local History
 1999 - Santa Fe Trail Association
 2001 - American Association for State and Local History
 2001 - American Association for State and Local History
 2002 - American Association for State and Local History
 2002 - American Association for State and Local History
 2003 - Travel Industry Association of Kansas 
 2004 - American Association for State and Local History
 2006 - American Association for State and Local History
 2006 - American Association for State and Local History
 2007 - Family Tree Magazine Award
 2008 - American Association for State and Local History
 2008 - American Association for State and Local History
 2008 - Western Writer's Association of America 
 2009 - Oregon-California Trail Association
 2011 - United States Department of the Interior Partners in Conservation Award

See also
 The Kansas Historical Quarterly (1931–1977)

References

External links
 Official website
 Kansas Memory, the Society's digital portal
 Register of Historic Kansas Places database

History of Kansas
Historical societies in Kansas
 
1875 establishments in Kansas
Organizations based in Topeka, Kansas
Organizations established in 1875